The Adelfoi Islets ("brothers") are two Greek islands in the Sporades. The 2001 census reported a population of eleven inhabitants.

Nearest islands and islets
Its nearest islands and islets are Alonnisos and Peristera, Skantzoura to the east and Euboea further south.

References

External links
Official website of Municipality of Aloníssos 

Landforms of the Sporades
Islands of Thessaly